William Adolph Irvin (December 7, 1873 - January 1, 1952) was the president of U.S. Steel.

Biography
He was born on December 7, 1873, in Indiana, Pennsylvania. In 1931 he was named vice president of U.S. Steel.

After his father died while he was in the eighth grade, he dropped out of grade school to support his mother. He went straight to the mines and worked his way up to the corporations, where he eventually became president. His first wife died giving birth to their fifth child. He and his second wife, Gertrude Irvin, never had any children.

He died on January 1, 1952, in the Harkness Pavilion of the Presbyterian Hospital in Manhattan, New York City.

S.S. William A. Irvin

Irvin's namesake ore boat, the William A. Irvin was christened in 1938 and served as a flagship of U.S. Steel's Great Lakes fleet until her retirement in 1978. The vessel was purchased by the Duluth Entertainment Convention Center and was converted to a maritime museum in 1986. It floats on a slip in the harbor of Duluth, Minnesota.

References

1873 births
1952 deaths
U.S. Steel people
People from Indiana, Pennsylvania